Heike A. Kubasch is a game designer who has worked primarily on role-playing games.

Career
Heike Kubasch was one of the original principles of Iron Crown Enterprises, along with Pete Fenlon, S. Coleman Charlton, Richard H. Britton, Terry K. Amthor, Bruce Shelley, Bruce Neidlinger, Kurt Fischer, and Olivia Fenlon. Kubasch wrote Angmar (1982), the first Middle-earth campaign supplement book published by ICE as a Rolemaster supplement.

Kubasch later became the President of Mjolnir LLC, with Bruce Neidlinger as CEO. Kubasch and Tim Dugger authored the game HARP: High Adventure Role Playing (2003) for Mjolnir.

Her D&D design work includes Monstrous Compendium Volume 1 (1989) and Monstrous Compendium Volume 2 (1989).

References

External links
 

21st-century American women
American women writers
Dungeons & Dragons game designers
Living people
Place of birth missing (living people)
Women science fiction and fantasy writers
Year of birth missing (living people)